Brian Higgins (born 1959) is a U.S. Representative for New York.

Brian Higgins may also refer to:

 Brian Higgins (sportscaster) (born 1982), American radio sportscaster
 Brian Higgins (producer) (born 1966), British music producer
 Brian Higgins (poet) (1930–1965), Irish poet, mathematician and rugby league player

See also
Brian Higgins, American alleged conspirator in the Gretchen Whitmer kidnapping plot
Bryan Higgins (1741–1818), Irish scientist
Bryan Higgins, member of the hip-hop group Leaders of the New School
 Bryan Higgins (cricketer) (1927-2003), New Zealand cricketer
Brian O'Higgins (1882–1963), Irish politician